The Portia Geach Memorial Award is an annual prize for Australian female portraitists. The Award was established in 1961 as a testamentary trust by Florence Kate Geach, sister of Australian painter Portia Geach, with an initial endowment of AU£12,000. The first prize given under the aegis of the Award was made in 1965, comprising a £1,000 prize to Jean Appleton for a self-portrait. In 2015, the Award was worth A$30,000.

The Award aims to support female artists working in the field of portraits painted from life, and is given based upon the field entries submitted to the Award. Under the terms of the initial endowment, the Award is designed to recognise:
... the best portraits painted from life of some man or woman distinguished in Art, Letters or the Sciences by any female artist resident in Australia during the 12 months preceding the date fixed by the Trustees for sending in the pictures and who was born in Australia or was British born or has become a naturalised Australian and whose place of domicile is Australia.

Previous winners
Past winners of the award have been:
2022 – Lynn Savery, Kindred Spirits
2021 – Marie Mansfield, Tilly
2020 – Caroline Zilinsky, Anthea May or May Not (portrait of Anthea Pilko, dancer)
2019 – Sally Robinson, Body in a box (self-portrait) – image
2018 – Zoe Young, Drawing Storyboards (portrait of Bruce Beresford) – image
2017 – Amanda Davies, Portrait of Pat Brassington – image
2016 – Jenny Rodgerson, Bound by the big red coat – image 
2015 – Natasha Bieniek, Sahara – image
2014 – Sophie Cape, Romper Stomper – image
2013 – Hélène Grove, Self Portrait. Getting On – image
2012 – Sally Robinson, The Artist's Mother – image
2011 – Kate Stevens, Indian Dream – image
2010 – Prudence Flint, Scrambled egg – image
2009 – Christine Hiller, The Old Painter
2008 – Jude Rae, Self Portrait 2008 (The Year My Husband Left)
2007 – Maryanne Coutts, Melbourne
2006 – Lucy Culliton, Self with Friends
2005 – Jude Rae, Large Interior (Micky Allan)
2004 – Nerrisa Lea, The Sheik & Me, Self Portrait with Imagined Portrait of Chad Morgan after Frida Kahlo
2003 – Wendy Sharpe, Self Portrait with Tea Cup and Burning Paintings
2002 – Vicki Varvaressos, Self Portrait with Painting
2001 – Mary Moore, At Home
2000 – Nancy Borlase, The Sisters: Marie and Vida Breckenridge – image (NPG)
1999 – Kim Spooner, Social Currency (Eva Cox) – image (NPG)
1998 – Anita Rezevska, Self Portrait – Woman from Riga
1997 – Maria Isabel, Cruz Maria
1996 – Su Baker, Self Portrait at Six Paces
1995 – Wendy Sharpe, Self Portrait with Students, After Adelaide Labille-Guiard
1994 – Jenny Sages, Ann Thomson
1993 – Aileen Rogers, Suzanne Mourot
1992 – Jenny Sages, Nancy Borlase and Laurie Short – image (NPG)
1991 – Rosemary Valadon, Frances Joseph
1990 – Jenny Watson, Self Portrait
1989 – Jenny Sands, Alex Karpin
1988 – Margaret Ackland, Shay Docking
1987 – Christine Hiller, Self Portrait
1986 – Christine Hiller, Self Portrait
1985 – Gwen Eichler, Dianne Fogwell
1984 – Margaret Woodward, Madeleine Halliday
1983 – Margaret Woodward, Self Portrait
1982 – Brenda Humble, Virginia Hall
1981 – Susan Howard, Jenny Kee
1980 – Judy Pennefather, Venie Schulenberg
1979 – Ivy Shore, Kondelea (Della) Elliott
1978 – Dora Toovey, Senator Neville Bonner
1977 – Ena Joyce, George Lawrence
1976 – Jocelyn Maughan, George Bouckley
1975 – Mary Brady, Elizabeth Rooney
1974 – Lesley H Pockley, Hugh Paget
1973 – Sylvia Tiarks, Self Portrait
1972 – Elizabeth Cummings, Jean Appleton
1971 – Mary Brady, Larry Sitsky – image (NPG)
1970 – Dora Toovey, Self Portrait in Landscape
1969 – Vaike Liibus, Guy Warren
1968 – Bettina McMahon, Self Portrait
1967 – Jo Caddy, Lawrence Daws
1966 – Mary Brady, Grahame Edgar
1965 – Jean Appleton, Self Portrait

References

Australian art awards
1961 establishments in Australia